Tom N. Robinson (born 10 November 1994) is a New Zealand rugby union player who plays for the  in Super Rugby and  in the Bunnings NPC. His position is Flanker. He was named in the Blues squad for the 2019 Super Rugby season. Robinson captained the  during the 2021 Super Rugby Aotearoa season in the absence of regular captain Patrick Tuipulotu.

Reference list

External links
itsrugby.co.uk profile

1994 births
New Zealand rugby union players
Living people
Rugby union flankers
Northland rugby union players
Blues (Super Rugby) players
Rugby union players from the Northland Region